Felipe Alves Raymundo (born 21 May 1988), known as Felipe Alves, is a Brazilian professional  footballer who plays for São Paulo, on loan from Fortaleza, as a goalkeeper.

Club career
Born in São Paulo, Felipe Alves finished his formation with Paulista. He made his first team debut on 28 March 2009, coming on as a half-time substitute in a 0–0 Campeonato Paulista away draw against Ituano.

Felipe Alves became a starter for the 2009 Campeonato Brasileiro Série D, and remained a first-choice in the following years. On 17 June 2011, he was loaned to Série B side Vitória until the end of the year.

On 8 December 2011, Felipe Alves moved to Atlético Sorocaba. Ahead of the 2014 season, he joined Audax, featuring regularly.

Felipe Alves served loan stints at Guaratinguetá, Paraná and Oeste, all of them managed by Fernando Diniz. On 2 February 2018, he agreed to a one-year deal with Atlético Paranaense in the Série A, again reuniting with Diniz.

On 3 June 2018, aged 30, Felipe Alves made his debut in the main category of Brazilian football, starting in a 3–1 defeat at América Mineiro.

Honours
Paulista
 Copa Paulista: 2010

Fortaleza
Campeonato Cearense: 2019, 2020, 2021
Copa do Nordeste: 2019

References

External links

1988 births
Living people
Footballers from São Paulo
People from São Paulo
Brazilian footballers
Association football goalkeepers
Campeonato Brasileiro Série A players
Campeonato Brasileiro Série B players
Campeonato Brasileiro Série C players
Campeonato Brasileiro Série D players
Paulista Futebol Clube players
Esporte Clube Vitória players
Clube Atlético Sorocaba players
Grêmio Osasco Audax Esporte Clube players
Guaratinguetá Futebol players
Paraná Clube players
Oeste Futebol Clube players
Club Athletico Paranaense players
Fortaleza Esporte Clube players
Esporte Clube Juventude players
São Paulo FC players